Sami Angawi is a Saudi architect. He studied architecture in the United Kingdom and the United States.

Early life
Dr. Sami Angawi has a Doctor of Philosophy in Islamic Architecture from the School of Oriental and African Studies, University of London, UK. Since 1988 he has been the founder and General Director of the Amar Center for Architectural Heritage which became The Al-Makkiyah Al-Madaniyah Institute in 2011, and which is located in Jeddah. In 2013, Dr. Angawi co-founded makmad.org e.V., a German non-profit organization headquartered in Hannover. His specific activities include the following:

 Revival and development of traditional architecture through research and studies. 
 Restoration and rehabilitation of traditional buildings and houses. 
 Designing new buildings and projects based on the continuity of the traditional line of architecture from all aspects.

Architectural style
Angawi's architectural designs assert the importance of his Hijazi heritage with the common cultural heritage shared by both western and Islamic societies; believing that a “clash of civilizations” need not lead to misunderstanding, but rather friendship, trust and peace.

Angawi developed the concept of balance, known in Arabic as mizan, which is the essence of Islamic tradition and of many of the world's religious beliefs. The aspiration of Angawi to reflect this historic principle in his life and work is important. It has made him a leader in building bridges between the Middle East and the rest of the world. “More balance can be achieved through respect for the past,” Angawi said in his personal blog by adding, “In our Al Makkiyah mansion, modernity and tradition, privacy and openness, stability and dynamism are equally represented to generate harmony.”

To carry out these activities the organizations developed an architectural library containing more than 50,000 images of traditional architectural elements and buildings stored in the computer using the laser disc technology, as well as a library of architectural drawings of many elements with varying designs and styles. The organizations have close contact and collaborates with various universities, research institutions and professional organizations on both local and international levels.

References

External links

Ourossoff, Nicolai. "New Look for Mecca: Gargantuan and Gaudy." The New York Times. December 29, 2010.
makmad.org e.V. "» makmad.org » the difference."

Year of birth missing (living people)
Living people
Saudi Arabian architects